SP-318  is a state highway in the state of São Paulo in Brazil. Part of it consists of the Rodovia Thales de Lorena Peixoto Júnior.

References

Highways in São Paulo (state)